Devin Lavell Davis (born December 27, 1974) is an American/Spanish professional basketball player from Miami University in Ohio.  He has played professionally in several leagues, including several seasons in Spain's Liga ACB.

Personal Life
Devin got married in August 2015 to his wife Zarinah Davis.

Career
A product of Miami Senior High School in Florida, Davis was an instant fan favorite as a Redskins freshman. As a senior in 1996–97, Davis steered Miami to a Mid-American Conference (MAC) championship, earning MVP honors in the tournament, according to Ultimate Sports Basketball Yearbook. Davis plays much bigger than his size but what makes him stand out is his devilish hair, he wears dreadlocks, short braids that stick out of his head like squirmy worms. In four years playing for the Miami University, Davis hit at a 15.4 ppg clip. He joined Chicago Bulls guard Ron Harper and former NBA center Wayne Embry as the only Redskins varsity players to finish their careers with at least 1,000 points and 1,000 rebounds.

Davis was the Idaho Stampede first round pick in the 1997 Continental Basketball Association draft, after his stint with Idaho, he played overseas in Spain, Philippines, and had stops in Russia, Mexico and Argentina. He won as the Best Import Award in the Philippines and won the Championship while playing with the Alaska Milkmen, averaging 28.5 pts and 11.3 rebounds per game.

External links
 Overtime with Devin Davis
 basketball.realgm.com
 Liga ACB profile
 Latinbasket profile

1974 births
Living people
Alaska Aces (PBA) players
American expatriate basketball people in Argentina
American expatriate basketball people in the Philippines
American expatriate basketball people in Russia
American expatriate basketball people in Spain
American men's basketball players
Baloncesto Fuenlabrada players
Basketball players from Miami
CB Breogán players
CB Gran Canaria players
CB Valladolid players
FC Barcelona Bàsquet players
Gimnasia y Esgrima de Comodoro Rivadavia basketball players
Gipuzkoa Basket players
Idaho Stampede (CBA) players
Liga ACB players
Miami RedHawks men's basketball players
Philippine Basketball Association All-Stars
Philippine Basketball Association imports
Power forwards (basketball)